Liga Sanjuanina de futbol is a football league based in and around San Juan city in Argentina. 

The most successful teams have traditionally been San Martin, Juventud Alianza and Desamparados, although none of these clubs have won the title since 1995.

As of August 2012 the league was headed by Alfredo Derito.

Primera A teams (2010)
Trinidad de San Juan, Independiente de Villa Obrera, San Martín de San Juan, Del Bono de Rivadavia, Marquesado, Sportivo Desamparados, Union de Villa Krause, Juventud Alianza de San Juan, Arbol Verde de Concepción, Penarol de Chimbas, Colon Junior (San Juan), 9 de Julio.

(Source:)

References

San
Football in San Juan Province, Argentina
1922 establishments in Argentina